20 Cygni is a single, orange-hued star in the northern constellation of Cygnus. It is a faint star but is visible to the naked eye with an apparent visual magnitude of 5.03.

The suffix notation indicates there are unusually strong lines of cyanogen in the spectrum. 20 Cyg is listed as one of the least variable stars in the Hipparcos catalogue, changing its brightness by no more than 0.01 magnitude. It has 1.28 times the mass of the Sun and has expanded to 13 times the Sun's radius. The star is radiating 57.5 times the Sun's luminosity from its enlarged photosphere at an effective temperature of 4,337 K.

References

K-type giants
Cygnus (constellation)
Cygni, d
Durchmusterung objects
Cygni, 20
188056
097635
7576